C40 Cities Climate Leadership Group is a group of 96 cities around the world that represents one twelfth of the world's population and one quarter of the global economy. Created and led by cities, C40 is focused on fighting the climate crisis and driving urban action that reduces greenhouse gas emissions and climate risks, while increasing the health, wellbeing and economic opportunities of urban residents.

From 2021, Mayor of London, Sadiq Khan, serves as C40's Chair, former Mayor of New York City Michael Bloomberg as Board President, and Mark Watts as Executive Director. All three work closely with the 13-member steering committee, the Board of Directors and professional staff. The rotating steering committee of C40 mayors provides strategic direction and governance. Steering committee members include: London, Freetown, Barcelona, Phoenix, Dhaka North, Tokyo, Buenos Aires, Bogotá, Abidjan, Montréal, Milan and Hong Kong.

Working across multiple sectors and initiative areas, C40 convenes networks of cities providing a suite of services in support of their efforts, including: direct technical assistance; facilitation of peer-to-peer exchange; and research, knowledge management & communications. C40 is also positioning cities as a leading force for climate action around the world, defining and amplifying their call to national governments for greater support and autonomy in creating a sustainable future.

History
C40 started in October 2005 when London Mayor Ken Livingstone convened representatives from 18 megacities to forge an agreement on cooperatively reducing climate pollution and created the 'C20'. In 2006, Mayor Livingstone and the Clinton Climate Initiative (CCI)—led by the efforts of former U.S. President Bill Clinton—combined to strengthen both organizations, bringing the number of cities in the network to 40 and helping to deliver projects and project management for participating cities to further enhance emissions reductions efforts.

Serving as C40's first chair, Livingstone established the C40 Secretariat in London, set up the C40 Steering Committee, and initiated the use of C40 workshops to exchange best practices amongst participating cities. In 2008, former Mayor of Toronto David Miller took over as C40 chair. Highlights of his tenure included the Copenhagen Climate Summit for Mayors and the C40 Cities Mayors Summit in Seoul, both in 2009, as well as the launch of practical action initiatives for cities, such as the Climate Positive Development Program and the Carbon Finance Capacity Building program.

Three-term Mayor of New York City Michael Bloomberg served as chair from 2010 to 2013. During his three-year tenure, Mayor Bloomberg demonstrated unwavering commitment to building a professional organization and establishing measurable and uniform benchmarks for success, as well as expanding knowledge-sharing between cities and partner organizations with similar priorities. Key milestones during his chairmanship include the full integration of the CCI Cities Program into the C40, and the C40 Mayors Summits in Sao Paulo and Johannesburg. Under Mayor Bloomberg's leadership, C40 grew to include 63 cities.

In December 2013 former Mayor of Rio de Janeiro Eduardo Paes became Chair of C40. During his tenure Mayor Paes oversaw the addition of more than 20 new member cities (particularly those in the Global South) several groundbreaking research reports, successful international events, and thriving global partnerships, all of which are helping cities make real contributions to the reduction of global greenhouse gas emissions and climate risks. He also helped launch the Compact of Mayors (now the Global Covenant of Mayors for Climate & Energy), put in place the C40 Cities Finance Facility, and oversaw the opening of a permanent C40 office in Rio de Janeiro, at the Museum of Tomorrow.

In 2015, as C40 marked its 10th anniversary, cities were crucial voices in shaping and advocating for a strong Paris Agreement—just as city leaders will be crucial in delivering on its ambition going forward. More than 1,000 mayors, local representatives, and community leaders from around the world took part in the Climate Summit for Local Leaders, hosted by Mayor of Paris Anne Hidalgo and the UN Secretary-General's Special Envoy for Cities and Climate Change Michael R. Bloomberg during the 2015 United Nations Climate Change Conference.

In August 2016, Mayor of Paris Anne Hidalgo became C40's first chairwoman after being voted in unanimously by the Steering Committee. Mayor Hidalgo has announced an ambitious agenda for the organization, including plans to focus on securing green financing, supporting compliance with the Global Covenant of Mayors for Climate & Energy, encouraging inclusive and sustainable growth in cities, and recognizing the leadership of women in tackling climate change.

In December 2016, C40 held its sixth biennial Mayors Summit in Mexico City. The Global Summit, hosted by Mayor of Mexico City Miguel Ángel Mancera, was attended by 1,400 people, including representatives from more than 90 cities.

The current chair of C40 Cities is Mayor Sadiq Khan of London, UK.

C40 cities
C40 has 96 member cities across seven geographic regions.

 Africa: 
  – Addis Ababa
  – Accra 
  – Abidjan 
  – Nairobi 
  – Lagos
  – Dakar 
  – Freetown 
  – Cape Town 
  – Durban 
  – Ekurhuleni 
  – Johannesburg 
  – Tshwane 
  – Dar es Salaam 
 East Asia: 
  – Beijing 
  – Chengdu 
  – Dalian 
  – Fuzhou 
  – Guangzhou 
  – Hangzhou 
  – Hong Kong 
  – Nanjing 
  – Qingdao 
  – Shanghai 
  – Shenzhen
  – Wuhan
  – Zhenjiang
  – Tokyo
  – Yokohama
  – Seoul
 Europe: 
  – Copenhagen
  – Paris
  – Berlin
  – Heidelberg
  – Athens
  – Milan
  – Rome
  – Venice
  – Amsterdam
  – Rotterdam
  – Oslo
  – Warsaw
  – Lisbon
  – Moscow
  – Barcelona
  – Madrid
  – Stockholm
  – Istanbul
  – London
 South America:
  – Buenos Aires
  – Curitiba
  – Rio de Janeiro
  – São Paulo
  – Salvador
  – Santiago
  – Bogotá
  – Medellín
  – Quito
  – Lima
  – Caracas
 North America:
  – Montreal
  – Toronto
  – Vancouver
  – Guadalajara
  – Mexico City
  – Austin
  – Boston
  – Chicago
  – Houston
  – Phoenix
  – Los Angeles
  – Miami
  – New Orleans
  – New York City
  – Philadelphia
  – Portland
  – San Francisco
  – Seattle
  – Washington, DC
 South and West Asia:
  – Dhaka
  – Bengaluru
  – Chennai
  – Jaipur
  – Kolkata
  – Mumbai
  – New Delhi
  -  Ahmedabad
  – Tel Aviv
  – Amman
  – Karachi
  – Dubai
 Southeast Asia & Oceania:
  – Melbourne
  – Sydney
  – Jakarta
  – Kuala Lumpur
  – Auckland
  – Quezon City
  – Singapore
  – Bangkok
  – Hanoi
  – Ho Chi Minh City

Membership
While C40 originally targeted megacities for their greater capacity to address climate change, C40 now offers three types of membership categories to reflect the diversity of cities taking action to address climate change. The categories consider such characteristics as population size, economic output, environmental leadership, and the length of a city's membership.

1. Megacities

 Population: City population of 3 million or more, and/or metropolitan area population of 10 million or more, either currently or projected for 2025. OR
 GDP: One of the top 25 global cities, ranked by current GDP output, at purchasing-power parity (PPP), either currently or projected for 2025.

2. Innovator Cities

 Cities that do not qualify as Megacities but have shown clear leadership in environmental and climate change work.
 An Innovator City must be internationally recognized for barrier-breaking climate work, a leader in the field of environmental sustainability, and a regionally recognized “anchor city” for the relevant metropolitan area.

3. Observer Cities

 A short-term category for new cities applying to join the C40 for the first time; all cities applying for Megacity or Innovator membership will initially be admitted as Observers until they meet C40's year-one participation requirements, for up to one year.
 A longer-term category for cities that meet Megacity or Innovator City guidelines and participation requirements, but for local regulatory or procedural reasons, are unable to approve participation as a Megacity or Innovator City expeditiously.

C40 global initiatives
C40 help cities replicate, improve and accelerate climate action. These city-only working groups provide for honest knowledge exchange, enabling cities to tap into the global expertise of their peers as well as connect with technical partners. Through networks, cities find opportunities to undertake joint projects in areas of mutual interest and benefit. C40 networks also amplify individual city solutions by providing a global platform for showcasing city successes. Networks are designed to be dynamic and nimble, responding to the changing needs and priorities of participating cities. C40 has established a data-driven approach to identify and launch networks, ensuring that resources are strategically deployed by mapping city priorities to focus areas with the greatest potential GHG and climate risk impact.

Climate Positive

C40 research
The C40 Research, Measurement and Planning team leverages their unprecedented database of city actions, extensive network of partnerships, and unique organizational insight to demonstrate the power of cities to address climate change. C40's Research analyses key trends, identify opportunities for further action across the global C40 network, and help prioritize C40 initiative areas with the greatest potential for action and impact. C40's research agenda is committed to turning data and planning into implementation. Producing tools, standards and frameworks Research, Measurement and Planning supports cities to implement the most impactful mitigation and adaptation actions and measure and manage their effectiveness.

Financing 
C40's work is made possible by three strategic funders: Bloomberg Philanthropies, Children's Investment Fund Foundation and Realdania.

Additional funding is from the British Department for Business, Energy & Industrial Strategy, the German Federal Ministry for the Environment, Nature Conservation and Nuclear Safety, The Ministry of Foreign Affairs of Denmark, Arup Group, Johnson & Johnson, Open Society Foundations, Climate & Clean Air Coalition, ClimateWorks Foundation, European Climate Foundation, George Washington University, Global Environment Facility, Grundfos, International Council on Clean Transportation, London School of Hygiene & Tropical Medicine, Novo Nordisk, Qlik, Robert Wood Johnson Foundation, Rockefeller Brothers Fund, Sainsbury Family Charitable Trusts, Stavros Niarchos Foundation 
, Velux, Wellcome Trust, and William and Flora Hewlett Foundation.

See also 

Climate change adaptation
Climate change mitigation
Covenant of Mayors
Energy conservation
ICLEI – Local Governments for Sustainability
Individual and political action on climate change
List of largest cities
London Climate Change Agency
PlaNYC
Renewable energy
United Cities and Local Governments
World energy supply and consumption

References

External links

C40 cities official website
1st World Cities Leadership Climate Change Summit, London, 2005
2nd World Large Cities Climate Summit, New York, 2007
3rd Large Cities Climate Summit, Seoul, 2009
New York City Mayor, Michael Bloomberg's 2007 Keynote Address.
Micro-Motives for State and Local Climate Change Initiatives, Harvard Law and Policy Review, Vol. 2, pp. 119–137, 2008

City
International climate change organizations
Municipal international relations
Sustainable urban planning
Environmental organizations established in 2005
2005 in international relations